Jerzy Czubała (7 January 1933 – 22 April 2017) was a Polish footballer who played as both a forward and midfielder during the summer months and was an ice hockey player over the winter.

Biography

Early years 
Born in Łazy he spent the duration of World War II in Kraków. After the war his family moved to Gdynia where the family had a house before the war.

Football 
Czubała started playing football for the youth sides with Gedania Gdańsk. In 1952 he moved to Lechia Gdańsk making his debut against Wawel Kraków. During his time with Lechia he played in the 1955 Polish Cup final against Legia Warsaw, starting he game as Lechia lost 5-0. In the 1956 season he played 20 times as Lechia achieved their greatest achievement in their early history by finishing 3rd in the I liga. In 1958 he briefly left Lechia to play with Resovia Rzeszów, playing 2 times over six months before returning to Lechia for the following season. After his return to Lechia he played 3 more times, making a total of 83 appearances and scoring 4 goals during his spell at Lechia Gdańsk. In 1960 Czubała emigrated to Australia playing with one of the Polish diaspora teams, Polonia Sydney, retiring from playing in 1962. After retiring he had a brief spell managing Polonia Sydney.

Ice Hockey 
During the winters Czubała played ice hockey, admitting that he preferred ice hockey to football. He played for Włókniarz Gdańsk, Gedania Gdańsk, Kolejarz Tczew and Stoczniowiec Gdańsk in a career which spanned 8 years.

Later years 
While in Gdańsk he graduated from Medical University of Gdańsk in 1955 after studying dentistry. After moving to Australia and retiring from football he set up a dental practice which he ran for 42 years. He died on 22 April 2017 aged 84.

References 

1933 births
2017 deaths
People from Łazy
People from Kielce Voivodeship (1919–1939)
Polish footballers
Gedania 1922 Gdańsk players
Lechia Gdańsk players
Resovia (football) players
Association football midfielders
Association football forwards